Out of Dreams is the debut EP by Hoylake indie rock band The Rascals, first released on 9 December 2007.

The EP features "Out of Dreams", the second track of their debut album Rascalize, along with three other songs.

Track listing

References

2007 debut EPs
The Rascals (English band) albums